Anshan Xincun is a station on Shanghai Metro Line 8.  It began operation on December 29, 2007.

Railway stations in Shanghai
Line 8, Shanghai Metro
Railway stations in China opened in 2007
Shanghai Metro stations in Yangpu District